The rivière du Gouffre (English: Pit Cave River) is a tributary of the left bank of the Saint-Laurent river, flowing into the Capitale-Nationale administrative region, Quebec (Canada). This watercourse flows through Regional County Municipality from:
 Charlevoix-Est: unorganized territory of Mont-Élie (Lacoste township), municipalities of Saint-Aimé-des-Lacs and Notre-Dame-des-Monts;
 Charlevoix Regional County Municipality: unorganized territory of Lac-Pibauka (Zec des Martres), municipality of Saint-Urbain and town of Baie-Saint-Paul.

This hydrographic slope has 185 lakes and 35 tributaries. The Zec des Martres attracts tens of thousands of visitors each year, particularly because of its mountain trails offering splendid views of the Gouffre River Valley, as well as sport fishing.

Hydrology 
The Gouffre River has its source at Lac du Cœur (length:  altitude), in the County of Charlevoix West, in the Zec des Martres which is located east of the Grands-Jardins National Park and west of Hautes-Gorges-de-la-Rivière-Malbaie National Park.

From this water separation line, the Malbaie River bypasses the valley of the rivière du Gouffre in a clockwise direction, to flow to La Malbaie in the Saint Lawrence River.

The Rivière du Gouffre flows towards the Southwest for a total distance of  before reaching the Saint-Laurent at Baie-Saint-Paul. Its course runs along the western boundary of the municipality of Notre-Dame-des-Monts and crosses Saint-Urbain. This river is characterized by its sinuosities and the presence of many rapids.

The river Gouffre flows on  according to the following segments:

Upper course of the river (segment of )

From the mouth of the Lac du Coeur, the Rivière du Gouffre flows over:
  northwesterly to the east shore of Lac du Gouffre;
  southwesterly across Lac du Gouffre;
  south-east to a small lake;
  south-east to the confluence of a creek (coming from the northeast);
  south to the confluence of the rivière des Îlets (coming from the West);
  southeasterly to the limit of the Lacoste township;
  easterly to Lacoste Township, to the western limit of De Sales Township (Saint-Aimé-des-Lacs).

Intermediate course of the river (segment of )

From the western limit of De Sales Township, the Gouffre River flows over:

  to the South-East, forming the boundary between the canton of Lacoste and the canton of De Sales, and collecting the waters of the dump of Lake Nice (coming from North-East) ;
  to the southeast, forming the boundary between Saint-Aimé-des-Lacs and Saint-Urbain, the limit of Notre-Dame-des-Monts;
  to the southeast, forming the boundary between Saint-Urbain and Notre-Dame-des-Monts, to Bouliane Creek (from the North);
  to the South winding to the outlet of the Lac aux Brochets (coming from the East);
  southwesterly winding to the confluence of the Chicago River (coming from the Southeast);
  southwesterly to the rivière du Gouffre Sud-Ouest (coming from the North);
  southwesterly to the rivière à la Loutre (Gouffre River tributary) (coming from the South-East);
  southwesterly to Preveche Creek (from the northwest);
  southwesterly to the limit of Notre-Dame-des-Monts.

Lower course of the river (segment of )

From the limit of Notre-Dame-des-Monts, the river Gouffre flows over:

  to the southwest in Saint-Urbain to the outlet of the Lac à la Mine (coming from the South-East);
  southwesterly to Swan Creek (from the northwest);
  southwesterly to the river Le Gros Bras (Gouffre River tributary) (coming from the northwest);
  southwesterly winding up to the road bridge of the village of Saint-Urbain;
  southeasterly to the bridge route 138;
  south to the city limit of Baie-Saint-Paul;
  to the South winding in Baie-Saint-Paul, until the confluence of the Rémy River (coming from the West);
  southeasterly collecting the discharge from the Mares river (coming from the south), to the confluence of the ruisseau de la Goudronnerie (coming from the Northeast);
  towards the south by zigzagging and collecting the Gobeil stream (coming from the east), up to the rivière des Mares (coming from the south);
  to the south, winding through an agricultural zone, collecting the discharge from the Renaud river (coming from the west) and entering an urban zone at the end of the segment, until the confluence of the Bras du Nord-Ouest (Gouffre River tributary) (coming from the West);
  southerly forming a northeasterly curve to the road bridge;
  southeasterly to the confluence of the river.

The Gouffre River empties onto the "Bay Bank" on the North Shore of the St. Lawrence River in front of Île aux Coudres. At the confluence of the river, the strike is long  to the southeast at low tide. In addition to the confluence of the Rivière du Gouffre, the main rivers flowing over this strike are (from west to east): Verreault Creek, Rivière du Moulin (Baie-Saint-Paul), Middle Creek, Vases River, Rang Saint-Laurent Creek, Lucien Creek and Bois Blanc Creek.

Its main tributaries are the Le Gros Bras, rivière des Mares and the rivière du Gouffre Sud-Ouest.

Toponymy 
The river Gouffre was named by Samuel de Champlain in 1608. Its name refers to the whirlpool that forms at the foot of Cap aux Corbeaux, downstream from the confluence of the river Gouffre, and which was a source of terror for sailors.

The toponme "Rivière du Gouffre" was formalized on December 5, 1968 at the Commission de toponymie du Québec.

Recreational tourism activities 
The Rivière du Gouffre is an Atlantic salmon fishing river and a trout.

At the beginning of the twentieth century, sport fishermen in the Quebec region frequented these waters, which had and still have the reputation of offering large salmon. The population of this species can vary in number significantly from one year to the next. Since 1979, the Association of Conservation of the Valley of the Gouffre (ACVG) manages the salmon fishery. This non-profit organization was formed on March 20, 1979, thanks to the grouping of some forty members. In spring 1979, 100 salmon pits are inventoried in the Rivière du Gouffre. Since then, the ACVG has built 65 of these pits. Pedestrian paths run along the river; picnic tables and shelters have been set up. Two bridges span the river allowing fishermen access to all salmon pits.

Notes and references

See also 
 Lac-Pibauka, a TNO
 Mont-Élie, a TNO
 Saint-Aimé-des-Lacs, a municipality
 Notre-Dame-des-Monts, a municipality
 Saint-Urbain, a municipality
 Baie-Saint-Paul, a city
 Charlevoix Regional County Municipality
 St. Lawrence River
 Grands-Jardins National Park
 Zec des Martres, a harversted controlled zone
 List of rivers of Quebec

Rivers of Capitale-Nationale
Charlevoix Regional County Municipality